The 2020 Women's Volleyball South American Olympic Qualification Tournament was a volleyball tournament for women's national teams held in Bogota, Colombia from 7 to 9 January 2020. 4 teams played in the tournament, where the winner qualified to the 2020 women's Olympic volleyball tournament.

Qualification
The top four teams from the 2019 South American Championship which had not yet qualified to the 2020 Olympic Games qualified for this tournament. Final standings of the 2019 South American Championship are shown in brackets.

 (2)
 (3)
 (4)
 (5)

Pool standing procedure
 Number of matches won
 Match points
 Sets ratio
 Points ratio
 Result of the last match between the tied teams

Match won 3–0 or 3–1: 3 match points for the winner, 0 match points for the loser
Match won 3–2: 2 match points for the winner, 1 match point for the loser

Round robin
All times are Colombia Time (UTC−05:00).

|}

|}

Final standing

See also
Volleyball at the 2020 Summer Olympics – Men's South American qualification

References

External links
Official website – FIVB

2020 in volleyball
Volleyball qualification for the 2020 Summer Olympics
January 2020 sports events in South America